Ruggero Freddi (born October 6, 1976) is an Italian mathematics lecturer and former gay pornographic film actor known professionally as Carlo Masi.

Early life and education
Freddi was born in Rome in 1976 to a "poor" family. His parents divorced when he was three years old. At the age of 14, he began to work out at a local gym, practicing bodybuilding assiduously. In 2002, when he was about to complete his first cycle of study at the Sapienza University of Rome, he moved to Canada, and subsequently to New York.

Career 
In 2003, Masi completed a Master of Science (MSc) degree in computer engineering at the Sapienza University of Rome and worked in an artificial intelligence laboratory.

Pornography
In 2004, after being contacted by a Colt Studio Group (CSG) recruiter, he made his debut in the gay pornography industry participating in his first porn movie, Big N 'Plenty. After his debut, he signed an exclusive model contract with CSG. He has always promoted safe sex, fraternising with the Italian LGBT community.

In 2006, he was selected to appear on the cover of COLT 40, a coffee table book published to celebrate the fortieth anniversary of the production company.

In 2007, Masi and his future husband, Adam Champ, were selected to appear on the cover of the Damron 2007 Men's Travel Guide.

In 2008, CSG and Calaexotic released a dildo reproduction of Masi's penis. That same year, he was named the first and only Colt Man Emeritus and his contract was extended to life time one. In 2008, Masi and Champ, were selected to appear on the cover of Adam Gay Film & Video Directory Magazine.

Moreover, he was featured in several tours across America, Mexico and Europe to promote the CSG brand. His porn career lasted six years (from age 28 to 34). Following a disagreement with Colt in 2009, Masi retired from the pornographic industry.

He then entered the theatre industry. In 2010, he was officially announced as a permanent member of the cast of Saturday Night Live Italia but he never appeared on the show.
In 2011, he was included in the anthologies Porn from Andy Warhol to X-Tube and Gay Porn Heroes: 100 Most Famous Porn Stars.  In 2013, he was interviewed for the documentary HUSTLABALL BERLIN - A Documentary That Bares All. In 2014, he was included in the coffee table book produced by Colt entitled Hairy Chested Men.

Theatre

Academia
After working in the theatre, Masi decided to return to the Sapienza University of Rome. There he  earned a Bachelor of Science degree (cum laude) in mathematics, with a score of 110/110 and then a Master of Science degree (cum laude) in mathematics with a score of 110/110. In 2020, he completed a Ph.D. in Mathematical Models for Engineering, Electromagnetism and Nanosciences at Sapienza University of Rome focusing on the application of Morse theory to a Dirichlet problem traced back to Poisson equations.

While he was working on his doctorate, he was a lecturer for Analysis 1 and Analysis 2 courses at the Faculty of Engineering at the Sapienza University of Rome.

Media attention
In 2017, an article published by la Repubblica brought to light his past as a porn actor causing a media frenzy. The story was picked up by numerous newspapers around the world.

In 2020, writer Strega Prize winner  published La natura è innocente – Due vite quasi vere. This book is a double biography, told in alternate chapters, one of which is that of Ruggero Freddi.

In 2023, his story returns to the spotlight as he wins a lawsuit against the university he works for, for having fired him and for not paying him for the work done.

Personal life
In 2015, he married Prince Giovanni Fieschi Ravaschieri  in Porto. In 2016, he remained his widower.

During his participation at Pomeriggio Cinque, he proposed to his partner, . The civil union was celebrated on May 4, 2018, and was broadcast live on Pomeriggio Cinque.

Selected videography

Awards

See also 

 LGBT people in science
 List of actors in gay pornographic films

References

Citations

Bibliography

External links

1976 births
21st-century Italian male actors
21st-century Italian mathematicians
Gay academics
Gay scientists
Gay pornographic film actors
Gay sportsmen
Italian bodybuilders
Italian male stage actors
LGBT bodybuilders
Italian LGBT scientists
Italian LGBT sportspeople
Living people
Male actors from Rome
Sapienza University of Rome alumni
Academic staff of the Sapienza University of Rome
21st-century LGBT people